Sigrid Alegría Conrads (born 18 June 1974) is a Chilean film and television actress.

Alegría began her acting debut in the TVN soap opera Borrón y cuenta nueva in 1998, playing the role of "Doris Morán", a religious nun who was rethinking her life after she found a new lover.

In 2004, she left for Canal 13 to participate in the soap opera Hippie and also Tentación. Not happy with her contract to Canal 13, she decided to return to TVN.

Since 2007, she has been working on night time soap operas such as Alguien Te Mira, El señor de la querencia, and ¿Dónde está Elisa?.

Filmography

References

External links

1974 births
21st-century Chilean actresses
Chilean exiles
Chilean film actresses
Chilean television actresses
Chilean telenovela actresses
Living people
People from Rostock
Naturalized citizens of Chile
Actresses from Santiago
Chilean expatriates in East Germany
Citizens of Chile through descent
Chilean television personalities